The Man Who Knew Everything is a 2009 Russian film directed by Vladimir Mirzoyev on the same name  novel by .

Plot
Alexander Bezukdalnikov, as a result of an attempt to commit suicide, suddenly finds the phenomenal ability to instantly get an answer to any question. Modest and harmless, he becomes a good game for all —  women, criminal authorities and even international intelligence services. Some try to use it, others destroy it. But the  little man  continues to live according to the laws of his own conscience.

Cast
 Egor Beroev as  Alexander Bezukladnikov
 Ekaterina Guseva as Irina
 Yegor Pazenko as Sergey  Nemchenko
 Tatyana Lyutaeva as  Raisa Alekseevna
 Maksim Sukhanov as  Nikolay Shimkevich
 Olga Lysak as  Anzhela
 Andrey Tashkov as Valery Dmitrievich Stefanov

Awards and nominations
 Nika Award (2009):
 Best Supporting Actor — Maksim Sukhanov (win) 
 Best Cinematographer — Sergei Machilsky (nom)

References

External links
 

2000s fantasy drama films
Russian fantasy drama films
Censored films
Films based on Russian novels
2009 drama films
2009 films